"No Games" is a hip-hop song by American rapper Rick Ross, featuring vocals from American rapper Future. It was released as the second promotional single for his sixth studio album, Mastermind on September 6, 2013, when it was serviced to mainstream urban radio. The song was produced by frequent collaborators producers J.U.S.T.I.C.E. League.

Background and release
On September 5, 2013, the track was uploaded on Def Jam's YouTube channel. The next day it was serviced to mainstream urban radio as a single. The song became available for digital download on September 30, 2013.

Music video
The music video for "No Games" was filmed on October 10, 2013. This video was directed by Colin Tilley, visual effects were created by GloriaFX. On November 3, 2013, the music video was released.

Remix
On December 3, 2013, the official remix to "No Games" was released, it featured Future, and Maybach Music Group artists Meek Mill and Wale.

Chart performance

Release history

References

2013 singles
2013 songs
Rick Ross songs
Future (rapper) songs
Maybach Music Group singles
Def Jam Recordings singles
Music videos directed by Colin Tilley
Songs written by Rick Ross
Songs written by Future (rapper)
Song recordings produced by J.U.S.T.I.C.E. League
Songs written by Erik Ortiz
Songs written by Kevin Crowe